Cornelius Darragh (1809December 22, 1854) was an American lawyer and politician from Pennsylvania who served as a Whig member of the Pennsylvania State Senate, a U. S. District Attorney, a member of the U.S. House of Representatives and as state Attorney General.

Early life and education
Cornelius Darragh was born in Pittsburgh, Pennsylvania, one of six children to John Darragh, the 2nd Mayor of Pittsburgh and Margaret "Peggy" Calhoun.  He attended the Western University of Pennsylvania, and graduated with the class of 1826.  He studied law, was admitted to the bar in 1829 and commenced practice in Pittsburgh. In 1830, he married Mary Holmes Simpson.  They had two daughters, Margaret Calhoun and Elizabeth Simpson.

Career
He was a member of the Pennsylvania State Senate for the 21st district from 1836 to 1837 and the 19th district from 1838 to 1839.  He was United States district attorney for the western district of Pennsylvania from 1841 to 1844.
Darragh was elected as a Whig to the Twenty-eighth Congress to fill the vacancy caused by the resignation of William Wilkins.  He was reelected to the Twenty-ninth Congress.  He served as attorney general of Pennsylvania from January 4, 1849, to April 28, 1851.

Darragh died in Pittsburgh in 1854 and was interred in Allegheny Cemetery.

References

Sources

The Political Graveyard

External links

1809 births
1854 deaths
19th-century American politicians
Burials at Allegheny Cemetery
Pennsylvania lawyers
Pennsylvania state senators
Politicians from Pittsburgh
University of Pittsburgh alumni
United States Attorneys for the Western District of Pennsylvania
Whig Party members of the United States House of Representatives from Pennsylvania
19th-century American lawyers